The 1971–72 Serie A season was the 38th season of the Serie A, the top level of ice hockey in Italy. Eight teams participated in the league, and SG Cortina won the championship.

Final round

Placing round

External links
 Season on hockeytime.net

1971–72 in Italian ice hockey
Serie A (ice hockey) seasons
Italy